Good Vibrations: Thirty Years of The Beach Boys  is a box set by the American rock band the Beach Boys, released in 1993 by Capitol Records. It collects tracks spanning their entire career up to that point on four CDs. A fifth disc contains mostly studio session tracks, complete vocal and instrumental tracks, and rare live performances. The set also includes a car window decal. Though it never charted, Good Vibrations: Thirty Years of The Beach Boys went gold in the US just over four months after its release.

The first four discs anthologize the band with mostly mono single versions, but also several demos and unreleased songs; the tracks are organized essentially in chronological order. Disc 2 includes 30 minutes of music from the 1966/1967 Smile sessions, which had been heavily bootlegged for years but never officially released. In addition, there is a hidden recording at the end of Disc 1 of a young Brian Wilson singing "Happy Birthday Four Freshmen" to his favorite vocal group into his  tape recorder in 1960.

Track listing
All songs by Brian Wilson and Mike Love, except where noted.

References

1993 compilation albums
The Beach Boys compilation albums
Capitol Records compilation albums